The following is a partial list of notable alumni and faculty of Columbia College Chicago.

Notable alumni

Scott Adsit (1987) - actor on 30 Rock
Chester Alamo-Costello (1998) - artist and photographer
Melissa Albert (2006) - author of young adult fiction
Hettie Barnhill  (2006) - dancer in 2009 Broadway production of Fela!
Aidy Bryant (2009) - former cast member of Saturday Night Live
Shea Coulee (2011) - drag queen and contestant on RuPaul's Drag Race
Nick Charles - sports broadcaster
Common (attended briefly) - rapper, actor, author
Chet Coppock  (1971) - sports commentator for WLS radio
Greg Corner - musician, bass player of Kill Hannah, musical director and co-host of JBTV
David Cromer (attended briefly; award-winning director of Adding Machine)
Jeffrey Daniels - author and poet
Brant Daugherty (2008) - actor
Andy Dick - actor (attended briefly)
Phyllis Diller - comedian and actress
Jimmy Dore - stand-up comedian, former political commentator for The Young Turks, host of The Jimmy Dore Show 
Bruce DuMont (1969) - broadcaster
Aiden English (2010) - professional wrestler
Elaine Equi - poet
Deitra Farr - blues singer
Danny Fenster (2009) - journalist, editor of Frontier Myanmar
Mauro Fiore (1987) - Academy Award-winning cinematographer (Avatar, The Island, Tears of the Sun, Training Day)
Kathleen Flinn (1989) - New York Times best-selling author 
Paul Garnes - Producer Selma, QueenSugar, The Game
Greg Glienna - director and screenwriter
Michael Goi (1980) - cinematographer
Kevin Gosztola (2010) - journalist, writer, and documentarian
Shecky Greene (1946) - comedian and actor
Chester Gregory (1995) - actor, Broadway productions of Tarzan, Cry Baby, and Dreamgirls
Michael Grothaus (2000) - novelist, author of Epiphany Jones
John Guleserian - cinematographer
Hal Haenel (1981) - senior vice president of 20th Century Fox
Larry Heinemann (1971) - novelist, author of Paco's Story
David Heinz (2002) - film editor
Isabella Hofmann - actor
Erica Hubbard  (1999) - actor on Lincoln Heights
Jeremih (2009) - singer
Rashid Johnson  (2000) - photographer
Janusz Kamiński (1982–87) - Academy Award-winning cinematographer for Schindler's List, Saving Private Ryan
John Kass - columnist
Kid Sister (2004) - recording artist
Kyle Kinane (2002) - comedian
J. A. Konrath - writer of the Jack Daniels mystery series
Tina La Porta (1989) - Digital Artist
Jake Lloyd - actor, played Anakin Skywalker in Star Wars film
Josefina Lopez (1991) - author of Real Women Have Curves
Becky Lynch - professional wrestler
Shane Madej (producer) (2009) - founder of Watcher Entertainment, filmmaker, writer, producer
Liz Mandeville - blues musician, singer, songwriter, music producer, record label owner 
The Mazeking - contemporary visual artist
Kym Mazelle - singer and actress
Chris McKay - animator, film and television director, editor and producer
Austin P. McKenzie - actor 
Joe Meno (1997) - author
Sharon Mesmer (1983) - poet, author 
Michelle Monaghan - actress, Gone Baby Gone, Mission: Impossible III
Ozier Muhammad (1972) - Pulitzer Prize-winning photojournalist for The New York Times
Bob Odenkirk - writer for Saturday Night Live (1987–1995), actor (Breaking Bad, Better Call Saul)
Lola Omolola - journalist
Anita Padilla (1991) - reporter for FOX Chicago
Diane Pathieu (2001) - weekend news anchor for WLS-TV in Chicago
Steve Pink - actor, screenwriter and director
Tonya Pinkins (1996) - Tony Award-winning actress
Laura Post - voice actress
Mark Protosevich (1983) - screenwriter of I Am Legend, Poseidon, The Cell
Aidan Quinn - actor, Elementary, Legends of the Fall
Declan Quinn (1979) - cinematographer
Rob Renzetti - animator and creator of My Life as a Teenage Robot
Dean Richards reporter and broadcaster (1976)
Andy Richter (1988) - actor, sidekick on Conan
Saba (attended briefly) - rapper, record producer
Pat Sajak (1968) - host of Wheel of Fortune
Marcus Sakey - best-selling author
Anna D. Shapiro - theater director and Steppenwolf ensemble member
Silver Sphere (1999) – singer-songwriter
Bob Sirott (1971) - broadcaster
Matt Skiba - musician, lead singer and guitarist of Alkaline Trio
Coyla May Spring - Chautauqua dramatic reader, singer, pianist
Michael Stahl-David (2005) - actor, Cloverfield, The Black Donnellys
Dino Stamatopoulos - comedy writer
Greg Stimac (2005) - artist
Mike Stoklasa - director, actor, and creator of RedLetterMedia
Sumanth (1996) -  Indian film actor/producer 
Genndy Tartakovsky (1990) - creator of Dexter's Laboratory, Samurai Jack,  Sym-Bionic Titan
Robert Teitel (1990) - producer of Men of Honor, Barbershop, Notorious
George Tillman, Jr. (1991) - director of Men of Honor, Barbershop, Notorious
Glenna Smith Tinnin (1897) - women's suffrage leader and theater professional
Nadine Velazquez (2001) - actress in The League
Jim Verraros, dance musician and actor
Jordan Vogt-Roberts (2006) - film and television director
Lena Waithe - actress, producer, and screenwriter of Master of None
Ryley Walker - American singer-songwriter and guitarist
Frank Waln (2014) - Sicangu Lakota Native American rapper and activist
Sam Weller - (1990) author, biographer
Jon Wellner - actor, CSI 1997
Kanye West (attended briefly) - rapper, producer, fashion designer
Francis White (2007) - musician
Jim Williams - broadcaster
Timothy French - artist
Kimberly Jones (attended briefly) -  author

Faculty

† denotes former faculty member

Stephen T. Asma - writer
Martin Atkins - musician
Dawoud Bey - photographer
Pauline Brailsford †
Ivan Brunetti - sequential artist
Jim DeRogatis - music critic, co-host of Sound Opinions
Phyllis Eisenstein - fantasy and science fiction novelist
Jan Erkert - choreographer, teacher and writer
Ed Ferrara - television writer
Charles "Chuck" Harrison
Larry Heinemann †
Aleksandar Hemon - writer
Andy Herren - winner, Big Brother 15 (U.S.)
Joe Meno - author
Audrey Niffenegger - author
Edward L. Morris † - Journalist, CEO, President Chicago chapter of the National Academy of Television Arts and Sciences, Executive Grant Broadcasting
Sheldon Patinkin †
Melissa Potter - American interdisciplinary artist
William Russo - musician
John Schultz - writer
Gordon A. Sheehan  - animator †
Smino - rapper (attended briefly)
Jason Stephens
David Trinidad
Karen Volkman - poet
Sam Weller - journalist and author
Donda West  - musician †
John H. White - photojournalist

References

Chicago-related lists

Columbia